Stubbs the Zombie in Rebel Without a Pulse is a reverse horror video game developed by Wideload Games and published by Aspyr Media. It was released on October 18, 2005, for the Xbox video game console, and was released for Microsoft Windows and Mac OS X in November that same year. The game was released on February 10, 2006, in Europe.  The game was made available on Steam on May 17, 2007 and was later removed, but it became available for purchase again in March 2021 following an update which fixed several major compatibility and stability issues. It became available on Microsoft's Xbox Live Marketplace as an Xbox Originals on May 19, 2008, but was removed late 2012 due to technical issues.

Set in the retro-futuristic version of 1959, the game follows Stubbs rises from his grave as a zombie and decides to get his revenge by eating brains of the inhabitants of the Pennsylvania city of Punchbowl.

The game was a moderate success garnering favorable reviews and sales for the Xbox version. A sequel was planned, but since Wideload's closing in 2014, it has been since declared canceled.

On March 16, 2021, a remastered version of the game was published by THQ Nordic and released for PC (via Steam), PlayStation 4, PlayStation 5, Nintendo Switch, Xbox One and Xbox Series X/S, featuring modernized controls and achievements/trophies. An "I Love Stubbs" Collector's Edition, featuring a severed Stubbs statue and exclusive vinyl, is available as of July 2021 with a shipping date of Q4 2021.

Gameplay
Eating brains gives back a certain amount of lost health to the player as well as converting those humans into zombies, causing them to fight alongside the player. The player has the option of beating an enemy to death with melee strikes or to transform them into zombies. Stubbs' zombie state prevents him from wielding any conventional weapons, and instead wields a variety of improvised weaponry and combat techniques, most of which are done using a specific body part as explosives or makeshift devices. Stubbs can drive a wide variety of vehicles, such as cars, tractors and tanks. All of the aforementioned improvised weapons, excluding Stubbs' hand, will convert enemies they kill into zombies. Stubbs can herd zombies which are in range by whistling. Since there is a limit to how many zombies will follow him at a time, Stubbs can guide the rest by sending whole groups of zombies in a direction with a single shove. Stubbs' zombie followers can kill humans and eat their brains, just like Stubbs can, and any human killed by one of his minions will also turn into a zombie. An enemy that fires upon a zombie in a group will attract the attention of all the rest of the zombies. Crowds of zombies serve as a great shield when approaching enemies armed with ranged weapons and are needed for sowing the necessary chaos and confusion into a difficult melee.

Setting
Punchbowl is a retro-futuristic city that resembles the future as portrayed by the media in 1950s. It includes hovercars, laser weaponry, a monorail, and robots. Punchbowl was envisioned and funded by Andrew Monday and created by his teams of scientists, led by former Nazi scientist Dr. Hermann Wye.

Plot
In 1959, Andrew Monday, multi-billionaire playboy industrialist has founded the futuristic utopian city, Punchbowl, in Pennsylvania. During its opening ceremony, deceased traveling salesman, Edward "Stubbs" Stubblefield, rises from his grave as a Zombie and begins to consume the brains of the inhabitants of Punchbowl, quickly creating his own army of the undead, causing increasing amounts of havoc as the Zombies clash with the various militant factions of the area. As things begin to escalate, Stubbs heads to the Punchbowl Police Station where he is captured and the police chief is planning on dancing on Stubbs' grave. Stubbs manages to escape by ripping his hand off and using it to control a scientist to release his restraints. Stubbs makes his way to the chief's office where they have a dance-off before the chief dances to the armory, unaware he has Stubbs' pancreas stuck to him, which explodes, killing him.

As he continues his path of destruction, eating the brains of civilians, Stubbs comes across Otis, a paranoid trigger-happy leader of a local redneck militia called "The Quaker State Irregulars" who believes the Zombie outbreak is part of a Communist infiltration mission. Stubbs follows Otis back to his farm where he gives a rousing speech (consisting of only the word "Brains" in various cadences) to his fellow Zombies in a parody of the war film Patton. Upon cornering Otis, Stubbs seems to be at a disadvantage, as Otis has prepared a large stockpile of TNT which he intends to detonate, killing them both. But before he can light it, Otis seems to recognize Stubbs from when he was alive and begins to panic. This gives Stubbs the chance to light the TNT himself and escape to a safe distance before the house is blown up. He then rides a bewildered sheep back to Punchbowl. Stubbs goes to the dam where he relieves his bladder by urinating in the town's water supply, contaminating it, and then causes the dam to explode by having the other Zombies use themselves as electrical conduits.

Upon arriving at City Hall to confront Andrew, Maggie Monday (Andrew's very attractive mother), realizes the Zombie looks familiar and stops Andrew from shooting him, proclaiming her love for Stubbs. She explains that 26 years ago, during The Great Depression, she was a young country girl living at her family's farm. Stubbs, still a living man at the time, arrived at their house in an attempt to do business. Finding him extremely charismatic, Maggie took Stubbs back to her room where the two had sex. Unfortunately, Maggie's father, Otis, returned home and caught the two together. Unbeknownst to Maggie, he had killed Stubbs and dumped his body in the wilderness (in the same spot where Punchbowl would later be built). Maggie also reveals that she became pregnant with Andrew from the experience, making Stubbs his biological father. This is the cause of Stubbs' inordinate infatuation with Maggie shown throughout the game. The two share a romantic embrace, which is abruptly cut off by Stubbs eating her brains. Enraged by seeing his mother murdered and learning the truth of his conception, Andrew attacks Stubbs from behind a forcefield, partially destroying Punchbowl in the process. Stubbs survives the battle and attempts to murder Andrew, but is stopped by Maggie, who has become a Zombie herself. The game ends with Stubbs and Maggie sailing off in a small rowboat as Andrew and all of Punchbowl are destroyed by a nuclear missile strike to cleanse the undead infestation, and they both "live" happily ever after. During the credits, photos of things that happened during the events of the game are shown on the left.

Development
Stubbs the Zombie was Wideload Games' first game after its founding. The company's founder, Alex Seropian had previously co-founded and worked with Bungie and used the production as an experiment to determine how he would run an independent studio. The game's development began with a team of twelve, but Seropian decided to use contractors which raised the number to sixty. This decision brought difficulties when the hiring process wasn't properly overseen, leaving the team with a shortage of producers and lack of cohesion. A game development model was developed, with 12 full-time employees overseeing pre and post production phases, while independent contractors worked with the remaining content. Using the Halo engine provided some problem in the early stages. The engine was completely developed by Bungie and it lacked notes from them or peer reviews that would emphasize possible programming problems. Due to this, an excessive amount of time was spent determining which contractors would require training to use the engine, as well as how long they would receive instruction.

From the onset, the game's concept intended to innovate the horror genre by letting the player play as a zombie. Seropian claims that the team intended to take "something that people are familiar with" and turn it "upside down." The game was intended to contrast with what was regarded as the general idea of zombie games, changing the "straightforward good guys versus zombies" format found in games like Resident Evil. Humor became a key aspect during the developmental stage, with Seropian claiming that the team wanted to go "beyond just amusing dialogue in a cut-scene". Character dialogue and game mechanics were designed so that "funny results" are directly based on the player's action, preventing them from becoming repetitive or stale.

Reception

The Xbox version received "generally favorable reviews", while the PC version received "average" reviews, according to video game review aggregator Metacritic. Eurogamer claimed that the Xbox version had "lots of reasonable ideas that don't quite work" and "a general lack of cohesion".

The game was perceived as "painfully short" and "linear", but "never boring". The game's environments were described as "nicely varied", noting that "places like Punchbowl, the city of the future, are extremely well designed and appropriately cool looking." The game's soundtrack received predominantly positive reviews. The character's voice acting was described as the element that "set the game apart", to the point of claiming that "Never before have the sounds of zombie moaning been done so well in a game." IGN emphasized the "futile cries from civilians and armed foes" and "squishy, scalp-munching sound effects" as elements contributing to a higher quality than the game's visuals.

Detroit Free Press gave the Xbox version a score of all four stars, saying, "The chaos that ensues is as lighthearted as a blood-soaked zombiefest can be." CiN Weekly gave the same version a score of 78% and said, "Sure, it's not the most action-packed or finely tuned game, but there are enough clever attacks and humorous elements in Pulse to keep you playing through to see what other goodies - or appendages - they'll toss your way." However, The Sydney Morning Herald gave the game three-and-a-half stars out of five and called it "a brief ride and the action can become repetitive, but the sharp humour keeps you smiling."

Stubbs the character was ranked second on EGM's Top Ten Badass Undead.

The editors of Computer Games Magazine presented Stubbs the Zombie with their 2005 "Best Soundtrack" award.

Cannibalism controversy
Stubbs the Zombie, along with F.E.A.R., encountered controversy in November 2005 regarding cannibalism in games. NIMF's David Walsh and U.S. Senator Joe Lieberman also criticized the game as "cannibalistic" and harmful to underage children.  Senator Lieberman stated "It's just the worst kind of message to kids, and furthermore it can harm the entirety of America's youth". Wideload Games responded by saying that Stubbs is a zombie, not a human cannibal. GamePolitics also chided the report, calling it "ridiculous" and citing 36 mainstream news outlets had picked the story immediately after the NIMF report.

Soundtrack

The soundtrack to Stubbs features covers of 50s and 60s-era songs performed by popular and upcoming alternative rock artists.

References

External links
 
 Cannibalism story at GamePolitics.com

2005 video games
Aspyr games
Cooperative video games
Fiction set in 1933
Fiction set in 1959
MacOS games
Multiplayer and single-player video games
Nintendo Switch games
PlayStation 4 games
Video games about zombies
Video games developed in the United States
Video games scored by Michael Salvatori
Video games set in 1933
Video games set in 1959
Video games set in the 1930s
Video games set in the 1950s
Video games set in Pennsylvania
Video games with commentaries
Windows games
Xbox games
Xbox One games
Xbox Originals games